Four Corners is an unincorporated community in Brazoria County, Texas, United States. It is located within the Greater Houston metropolitan area.

History
Four Corners most likely received this name because of its location. The community had several scattered houses, farms, a few businesses, and a church in 1936, even though the community was not listed by name. Another business was in the area at the intersection and was most likely a combination gas station and store. There was a business located at the crossroads as late as the 1990s, but there were no population estimates available for the community.

Geography

Education
Four Corners is served by the Sweeny Independent School District.

References

Unincorporated communities in Brazoria County, Texas
Unincorporated communities in Texas